The 2012 Melbourne Football Club season was the club's 113th year in the VFL/AFL since it began in 1897.

On 2 February, Don McLardy was elected the club's new president, replacing Jim Stynes who was continuing his fight against cancer. Melbourne hosted nine of its eleven games at the Melbourne Cricket Ground, as well as one game against  at Etihad Stadium in Round 16 and one sold home-game against  at TIO Stadium in Round 17.

The Melbourne Football Club and its supporters will remember 2012 as being one of the worst seasons in the club's 154-year history. Headlined by the death of club-legend Jim Stynes just before the beginning of the season proper, Melbourne would produce one of its most disastrous seasons as they struggled to adapt to the fitness requirements of Mark Neeld's highly contested game plan implemented. After losing their first nine games of the season, Melbourne would upset second-placed , who had only lost one game at that stage of the season by a point in Round 10, by six points; their only other wins for the year would come against Greater Western Sydney (twice) and Gold Coast.

2012 list changes

2011 trades

Retirements and delistings

National draft

Rookie draft

2012 squad

2012 season

Pre-season

NAB Cup

Week 1

Week 2

Week 3

NAB Challenge

Week 4

Home and away season

Round 1

Round 2

Round 3

Round 4

Round 5

Round 6

Round 7

Round 8

Round 9

Round 10

Round 11

Round 12

Round 13

Round 14

Round 15

Round 16

Round 17

Round 18

Round 19

Round 20

Round 21

Round 22

Round 23

Ladder

Ladder breakdown by opposition

Jeremy Howe's Mark of the Year Nominations
A small highlight for the Melbourne Football Club this year was the fact that second year forward Jeremy Howe took several exciting contested marks throughout the season that would each earn him a Mark of the Year nomination. At 192 cm, Jeremy Howe has an athletic leap that had been shown sporadically in his first year at the club in 2011. In Round 8 against , Howe would win the 2012 Mark of the Year making him the third Melbourne Footballer to win the award in 6 seasons. Overall, he received 8 nominations:

Round 4: In the first quarter against , Cale Morton would kick the ball outside of Melbourne's defensive 50 to a small pack with Justin Sherman a few metres in-front. Jeremy Howe would leap above him and land his right knee on Sherman's left shoulder to. After grabbing the ball he would immediately fall on the ground, before immediately getting back up again to kick the ball off to Jack Watts.

Round 4: Later in the game midway through the final quarter, Nathan Jones would kick the ball long towards Melbourne's attacking 50. As a one-on-one contest was forming between Luke Tapscott and Shaun Higgins, Jeremy Howe would run in from the side of the contest and leap onto Tapscott before reaching up and grabbing the ball.

Round 6: Early in the second quarter against , James Sellar without any real option would bomb the ball from the centre square to inside Melbourne's attacking 50. Jeremy Howe would run towards the open middle of the pack and leap in mid air with Harry Taylor close to his side.

Round 8: Midway through the third quarter against Sydney, James Frawley would rebound the ball out of Melbourne's defensive 50 towards the boundary line. A one-on-one contest was about to form between Heath Grundy and Jeremy Howe. Jeremy Howe would leap firmly on Heath Grundy's left shoulder. He would balance himself on Grundy's shoulders for a couple of seconds before marking the ball and then fall of Grundy's shoulder's to land on his back.

Round 17: Late in the third quarter against , Jeremy Howe would run in from behind into a one-on-one contest between Alipate Carlile and Stefan Martin inside Melbourne's forward 50. With Troy Chaplin tagging him from behind, Jeremy Howe would leap onto of Carlile and Martin's shoulders to mark the ball. The forward momentum would then carry him over the top of Carlile and Martin as he would fall flat on his chest.

Round 19: In the dying seconds of the game against , Brad Green would kick the ball long into Melbourne's forward 50. With Campbell Brown tagging him, Jeremy Howe would leap over the top of Brown before colliding with Rohan Bail while falling to the ground. Howe would then take his run up and slot a goal after the siren.

Round 20: In the early stages of the second quarter, Jack Grimes would run around Jason Gram in the midfield, before kicking long towards a one-on-one contest between Brad Green and Tom Simpkin. Jeremy Howe would run in from the boundary-line perpendicular to the flight of the ball. Howe would then leap sideways before colliding with Simpkin to take the mark and then fall on top of him.

Round 21: Midway through the third quarter, Jordie McKenzie would kick the ball long to a pack from the center square into Melbourne's forward 50. Jeremy Howe would sprint forwards before leaping above Matthew Buntine to take the mark. He would then land on top of Chad Cornes whom was trying to spoil the ball after he took the mark.

Off Field Disasters
Throughout 2012, Melbourne was faced with a string of off-field disasters that begun in February and continued to commence throughout the rest of the year.

The off-field issues started on 2 February when club president Jim Stynes chose to resign in order to focus on his fight against cancer after having an operation the same day, Don McLardy would take over acting as full-time president. A month later on 9 March exciting forward Liam Jurrah was charged for assault with a machete at a town camp in Alice Springs and would face Alice Springs Magistrates Court throughout the course of the year.

On 20 March, Jim Stynes would finally lose his long battle with cancer, this ultimately had a major impact on the entire football club and played a major effect on the on-field morale of the team.

On 3 April, former  coach Grant Thomas would accuse Neeld of treating indigenous players differently from non-indigenous players by lecturing them as a group rather them lecturing them individually, Neeld would angrily deny these comments from Thomas.

2 days later Melbourne cut a 2 million dollar sponsorship deal with Energywatch after CEO Ben Polis made a series of discriminatory remarks and posts against women, Aboriginals and Asians on Facebook, one of which featured an edited picture of Liam Jurrah holding a machete in his hand whilst playing on-field. This left Melbourne without any major sponsors until Webjet signed a one-year deal a week later and Opel followed soon after as Melbourne's second major sponsor in Round 4.

Towards the end of the season, Melbourne's tanking speculations in 2009 were reignited when ex-Melbourne footballer and current  footballer Brock McLean claimed he left Melbourne because they were tanking (i.e. deliberately losing games for better draft picks). The meeting was held by General Manager of Coaching Chris Connolly and 10 other board members to ensure that Melbourne didn't win more than 4 matches for that season and hence ensure that Melbourne would receive a priority pick at the start of the 2009 AFL Draft. On 19 February, Melbourne were found not guilty for tanking. However Chris Connolly was suspended until 1 February 2014 and Dean Bailey was suspended for the first 16 round of the 2013 AFL season. In addition, Melbourne were fined $500,000 for their handling of both Connolly and Bailey during 2009.

Despite Melbourne's horrid year on and off the field they would still record a small operating profit of $77,618. This would be their fourth consecutive operating profit since 2009.

Awards

Brownlow Medal tally

Keith 'Bluey' Truscott Medal tally (top 10)

Keith 'Bluey' Truscott Trophy – Nathan Jones

Sid Anderson Memorial Trophy (Second in the Best and Fairest) – Jack Grimes

Ron Barassi Snr Memorial Trophy (Third in the Best and Fairest) – Tom McDonald

Ivor Warne-Smith Memorial Trophy (Fourth in the Best and Fairest) – Jordie McKenzie

Dick Taylor Memorial Trophy (Fifth in the Best and Fairest) – Jared Rivers

Harold Ball Memorial Trophy (Best Young Player) – Tom McDonald

Troy Broadbridge Trophy (highest polling MFC player in the Casey Best and Fairest) – Tom Couch

Ron Barassi Leadership Award – Jack Grimes and Jack Trengove

Ian Ridley Club Ambassador Award – Max Gawn

Norm Smith Memorial Trophy (Coach's Award) – Jordie McKenzie

Leading Goalkicker Award – Mitch Clark (29)

References

External links
Official Website of the Melbourne Football Club
Official Website of the AFL 

2012
Melbourne Football Club